Sublette is a variant of the French language surname Soblet. Other variations include Sublet, Sublett, and Soublet. In the United States, the Soblet family name traces back to French Huguenot refugee Abraham Soblet and his family, who arrived in Virginia in 1700 and settled in Manakintown

Notable people with Soblet/Sublett/Sublette surnames
 A. T. Sublett (1883 – 1961), American college football and baseball player
James Sublett, one of the first large-scale farmers in the Rio Grande valley of Texas, owner of Rancho Estelle
 Jesse Sublett (born 1954), American author and musician
 John William Sublett (1902 – 1986), known by his stage name John W. Bubbles, a vaudeville performer.

 Andrew Sublette (1808–1854), American mountain man
 Milton Sublette (c. 1801 – 1837), American mountain man
 William Sublette (1798–1845), American mountain man
 Bill Sublette (born 1963), Floridian politician
 Ned Sublette (born 1951), American musician and scholar

See also

References

French-language surnames